The United States House of Representatives elections in California, 1910 was an election for California's delegation to the United States House of Representatives, which occurred as part of the general election of the House of Representatives on November 8, 1910. Complete Republican dominance of California's congressional delegation ended when Democrats narrowly won one district.

Overview

Delegation composition

Results

District 1

District 2

District 3

Knowland was the nominee for both the Republican and Democratic Parties

District 4

District 5

District 6

District 7

District 8

See also
62nd United States Congress
Political party strength in California
Political party strength in U.S. states
United States House of Representatives elections, 1910

References
California Elections Page
Office of the Clerk of the House of Representatives

External links
California Legislative District Maps (1911-Present)
RAND California Election Returns: District Definitions

1910
California United States House of Representatives
1910 California elections